Ronni Reis (sometimes spelled Ronnie Reis; also Ronni Reis-Bernstein) (born May 10, 1966) is an American former tennis player. Reis won three gold medals at the 1985 Maccabiah Games in Israel, the doubles bronze medal at the 1986 Goodwill Games, and the doubles gold medal at the 1987 Pan American Games. 

Reis played for the Miami Hurricanes at the University of Miami, where she won the NCAA doubles tournament in 1986 and was named the NCAA Senior Player of the Year in 1988.

Biography
She attended Miami Sunset High School in Miami, Florida. Reis won the 1984 Florida state singles championship while a senior in high school.

Reis won the gold medal, defeating American Jamie Golder, in the women's singles tennis event at the 1985 Maccabiah Games in Israel, when she was 19 years old. She also won the women's doubles (with Eileen Tell) and the mixed doubles at the 1985 Maccabiah Games. She won the doubles bronze medal at the 1986 Goodwill Games, and the doubles gold medal at the 1987 Pan American Games.

She played collegiate tennis at the University of Miami, partnering with Lise Gregory to win the NCAA tournament in 1986; they finished the season 29-0. Reis was named All-American every year in which she played, in both singles and doubles, winning eight such honors in total. She was named by Tennis Magazine to its Collegiate All-Star team in 1986, 1987, and 1988 and was picked for  the USTA Federation Cup team those years. She was the NCAA Senior Player of the Year in 1988. 

Reis played two years on the pro circuit, and her highest ranking was 78th in singles (February 27, 1989) and 31st in doubles (August 1, 1988). She played in four WTA doubles finals.

She was the head women's tennis coach at Florida International University starting in 1997, and subsequently the head women's tennis coach at the University of Michigan.

In 2000, Reis was inducted into the University of Miami Sports Hall of Fame.

WTA Tour finals

Doubles 4 (2-1)

References

External links

 
 
 University of Miami women's tennis records

American female tennis players
Miami Hurricanes women's tennis players
Tennis players at the 1987 Pan American Games
Pan American Games medalists in tennis
1966 births
Living people
Pan American Games gold medalists for the United States
Goodwill Games medalists in tennis
Competitors at the 1986 Goodwill Games
Medalists at the 1987 Pan American Games
Jewish tennis players
Jewish American sportspeople
Maccabiah Games gold medalists for the United States
Competitors at the 1985 Maccabiah Games
Maccabiah Games medalists in tennis
Michigan Wolverines women's tennis coaches
21st-century American Jews
21st-century American women